Nikolai Nikolayevich Ivannikov (born 16 February 1992) is a Russian professional football player. He plays for FC Metallurg Lipetsk.

Club career
He made his Russian Football National League debut for FC Zhemchuzhina-Sochi on 28 April 2011 in a game against FC Fakel Voronezh.

External links
 
 

1992 births
Sportspeople from Lipetsk
Living people
Russian footballers
Association football forwards
Russia youth international footballers
FC Zhemchuzhina Sochi players
FC Tosno players
FC Saturn Ramenskoye players
FC Orenburg players
FC Metallurg Lipetsk players
FC Spartak Moscow players
FC Akron Tolyatti players
FC Dynamo Bryansk players
Russian First League players
Russian Second League players